UES may refer to:

 C.D. Universidad de El Salvador, a professional football team representing the University of El Salvador
 Estadio Universitario UES, a multi-use stadium in San Salvador, El Salvador
 FGC UES, the owner and operator of the electricity transmission grid in Russia
 RAO UES, an electric power holding company in Russia
 UES (cipher), a block cipher designed in 1999 by Helena Handschuh and Serge Vaudenay
 User Electronic Signature
 Unified Export Strategy, an application process that US agricultural trade promotion groups use to apply for funding
 Union des Employes de Service, Local 298 v. Bibeault, a Canadian Supreme Court case regarding judicial review in Canadian administrative law
 University of El Salvador, the oldest and one of the most prominent university institutions in El Salvador
 Upper East Side, a neighborhood in the borough of Manhattan in New York City
 Upper Eastside, a neighborhood of the city of Miami, Florida, United States
 Upper esophageal sphincter, the superior portion of the esophagus